Corliss Tunnel, located at Corliss Street south from West Carson Street in the Elliott neighborhood of Pittsburgh, Pennsylvania, was built in 1914.  It was added to the List of Pittsburgh History and Landmarks Foundation Historic Landmarks in 2002.

References

External links

Corliss Tunnel @ pghbridges.com

Tunnels completed in 1914
Road tunnels in Pennsylvania